Miguel Ángel Montero (San Miguel de Tucumán, 9 July 1922 - Buenos Aires, 29 August 1975) was an Argentine tango singer. His works at Osvaldo Pugliese's Orchestra were notable, including song 'Acquaforte' and 'Antiguo reloj de cobre' (English: 'Old copper clock'). He died by myocardial infarction in 1975.

External links
  Biography
  

1922 births
1975 deaths
20th-century Argentine male singers
Orquesta Osvaldo Pugliese
People from Tucumán Province
Tango singers